Mike Dobrinski is an American politician serving as a member of the Oklahoma House of Representatives from the 59th district. He assumed office in 2020.

References

21st-century American politicians
Living people
Republican Party members of the Oklahoma House of Representatives
Year of birth missing (living people)